Franz Joseph University may refer to:
 Franz Joseph Hungarian Royal University, founded in 1872, a former university in Kolozsvár, Austro-Hungarian Empire (nowadays Cluj-Napoca, Romania)
 Royal University of Franz Joseph I, founded in 1874 in Zagreb, Austro-Hungarian Empire, nowadays University of Zagreb, Croatia
 Franz Josephs Universität, founded in 1875 in Czernowitz, Austro-Hungarian Empire, nowadays Chernivtsi University, Ukraine